Jack "Jackie" Swindells (12 April 1937 – 23 June 2009) was an English professional footballer who played as an inside forward.

Career
Born in Manchester, Swindells played as an amateur for Manchester City, before turning professional with Blackburn Rovers in 1957. He also played for Accrington Stanley, Barnsley, Workington, Torquay United and Newport County, scoring a total of 65 goals in 190 appearances in the Football League. He later played non-League football for Altrincham and Radcliffe Borough.

Swindells will best be known as an Altrincam F.C favourite. Swindells' achievement of 82 goals in a single season is a record for Altrincham and he cemented his name in the Alty history.

Death
Swindells died on 23 June 2009, at the age of 72, at his home in Cornwall following a short illness.

References

1937 births
2009 deaths
Footballers from Manchester
English footballers
Manchester City F.C. players
Blackburn Rovers F.C. players
Accrington Stanley F.C. (1891) players
Barnsley F.C. players
Workington A.F.C. players
Torquay United F.C. players
Newport County A.F.C. players
Altrincham F.C. players
Radcliffe F.C. players
English Football League players
Association football inside forwards